

365001–365100 

|-bgcolor=#f2f2f2
| colspan=4 align=center | 
|}

365101–365200 

|-id=130
| 365130 Birnfeld ||  || Birnfeld, a German village located in the Hassberge Nature Park in northern Bavaria || 
|-id=131
| 365131 Hassberge ||  || Hassberge, a Nature Park located northwest of Bamberg, Germany || 
|-id=159
| 365159 Garching ||  || Garching, a German city north of Munich. || 
|-id=190
| 365190 Kenting ||  || Kenting National Park, Taiwan, has hosted the annual Hengchun Star Party since 2013. About 2000 people attend each year. || 
|}

365201–365300 

|-id=250
| 365250 Vladimirsurdin ||  || Vladimir Surdin (born 1953) is a Russian astronomer at Moscow State University. As one of the most famous science communicators in Russia, he has sparked many people's interest in space. || 
|}

365301–365400 

|-id=375
| 365375 Serebrov ||  || Aleksandr Serebrov (1944–2013), was a Hero of the Soviet Union, a Pilot-Cosmonaut of the USSR and the first president of the Soyuz Youth Aerospace Society. He was the author of over 20 scientific works and four inventions. He made four spaceflights and ten spacewalks || 
|}

365401–365500 

|-id=443
| 365443 Holiday ||  || Billie Holiday (1915–1959), born Eleanora Fagan, was one of the greatest jazz singers and songwriters of all time. She collaborated with numerous jazz greats, including Lester Young, Count Bassie and Artie Shaw. Her gorgeous voice and heartfelt songs continue to inspire. || 
|}

365501–365600 

|-bgcolor=#f2f2f2
| colspan=4 align=center | 
|}

365601–365700 

|-id=604
| 365604 Rusholme ||  || Benjamin Rusholme (born 1974) has contributed to the Very Small Array and QUaD Cosmic Microwave Background telescopes, the Planck and Euclid missions, and the Zwicky Transient Facility time-domain survey. || 
|}

365701–365800 

|-id=739
| 365739 Peterbecker ||  || Peter Becker (1672–1753), a professor of mathematics at the University of Rostock, Germany || 
|-id=756
| 365756 ISON ||  || The International Scientific Optical Network (ISON) is an international collaboration of optical observatories. The main scientific tasks of the ISON network are the study of the populations of space debris and minor solar-system, and observation of the optical counterparts of gamma-ray bursts. || 
|-id=761
| 365761 Popovici ||  || Călin Popovici (1910–1977), a Romanian astronomer || 
|-id=786
| 365786 Florencelosse || 2010 YJ || Florence Losse (born 1963), a French teacher || 
|}

365801–365900 

|-bgcolor=#f2f2f2
| colspan=4 align=center | 
|}

365901–366000 

|-bgcolor=#f2f2f2
| colspan=4 align=center | 
|}

References 

365001-366000